Eskalofrío (from escalofrío, Spanish for "Shiver") is a 2008 horror-thriller film directed by Isidro Ortiz and produced by Álvaro Augustin.

Cast
 Junio Valverde as Santi
 Blanca Suárez as Ángela
 Jimmy Barnatán as Leo
 Mar Sodupe as Julia
 Francesc Orella as whomlia

Reviews
The Movie Spot gave the film much praise saying "Great Spanish horror movie. Creepy and unnerving. Junio Valverde who plays Santi was great. Highly recommend it."

References

External links
 

2008 films
2000s horror thriller films
2008 horror films
Films scored by Fernando Velázquez
Spanish horror thriller films
2000s Spanish films
2000s Spanish-language films